Atikamekw of Manawan (French: Les Atikamekw de Manawan) are an Atikamekw First Nation in Quebec, Canada. They live primarily in the Atikamekw community of Manawan, an Indian reserve located in Lanaudière. In 2016, the band has a registered population of 2,892 members. It is governed by the Manawan Atikamekw Council (French: Conseil Atikamekw de Manawan) and is affiliated with the Conseil de la Nation Atikamekw, the Atikamekw tribal council.

Demographics
The members of the Manawan First Nation are Atikamekw. In October 2016, the band had a total registered population of 2,892 members, 409 of them were living off reserve. According to Statistics Canada's 2011 census, the median age of the population is 19 years old.

Geography
Atikamekw of Manawan live primarily on the Indian reserve of the same name, Manawan, located in Lanaudière, Quebec at 113 km northeast of Mont-Laurier. The service center located nearest is Saint-Michel-des-Saints and the closest important city is Montreal.

Culture
Culture, traditions and way of life of people of Manawan are governed by the six seasons that determine the activities and the travels on the territory. During each season there is a main activity and the camp site is different. The relationship with nature changes according to the season.

Languages
Atikamekw of Manawan speak Atikamekw language, a language of the Algonquian languages family. Atikamekw language is known by all the community and is the main language for day-to-day communication. It is the teaching language from pre-school to the third year of primary school. After that, teaching is done in French, which is the second language spoken by all the community.

Governance
Manawan First Nation is governed by a band council called Conseil Atikamekw de Manawan (French for "Atikamekw Council of Manawan") elected according to a custom electoral system based on Section 11 of the Indian Act. For 2014-2018 tenure, this council is composed of the chief Jean-Roch Ottawa and six councilors.

References

External links
 Official website 
 First Nation Detail by Indigenous and Northern Affairs Canada

Algonquian peoples
Atikamekw
First Nations governments in Quebec